Ruy Senderos (born 8 August 1988) is a Mexican actor. He is known for his performance as Heriberto Casillas in the Telemundo series El Señor de los Cielos. Although he previously had a notable character in the Argos Comunicación series Infames. Senderos has had main characters in series as La fiscal de hierro (2017), Ninis (2018), and currently in Julia vs. Julia (2019).

Filmography

Film roles

Television roles

References

External links 
 

Living people
Mexican male film actors
Mexican male telenovela actors
1988 births